Arundel is a market town and civil parish in the Arun District of the South Downs, West Sussex, England.

The much-conserved town has a medieval castle and Roman Catholic cathedral. Arundel has a museum and comes second behind much larger Chichester in its number of listed buildings in West Sussex.  The River Arun runs through the eastern side of the town.

Arundel was one of the boroughs reformed by the Municipal Reform Act 1835. From 1836 to 1889 the town had its own Borough police force with a strength of three. In 1974 it became part of the Arun district, and is now a civil parish with a town council.

Name

The name comes from the Old English Harhunedell, meaning "valley of horehound", and was first recorded in the Domesday Book. Folk etymology, however, connects the name with the Old French word arondelle, meaning "swallow", and swallows appear on the town's arms.

A further possible translation derived from the Domesday spelling of Harundel comes from the Anglo Saxon hærn dæl meaning tidal valley, this would mean that the name of the river Arun probably also derives from Tidal. Other local rivers such as the Rother deriving from the Anglo Saxon róðer which means Rower (as in a long river) are also descriptive of the river and its surrounds.

Governance

An electoral ward of the same name exists. This ward stretches north to Houghton with a total population at the 2011 census of 4,298. Arundel Town Council is based at Arundel Town Hall.

Geography

Arundel civil parish occupies an area somewhat larger than its built-up clusters, with the old town towards the north and the new to the south, separated by a main road.

Arundel town is a major bridging point over the River Arun as it was the lowest road bridge until the opening of the Littlehampton swing bridge in 1908. Arundel Castle was built by the Normans to protect that vulnerable fairly wooded plain to the north of the valley through the South Downs. The town later grew up on the slope below the castle to the south. The river was previously called the Tarrant and was renamed after the town by antiquarians in a back-formation.

Arundel includes meadows to the south but is clustered north of the A27 road, which narrowly avoids the town centre by a short and congested single carriageway bypass. Plans for a more extensive, HQDC bypass were debated intensely between 1980 and 2010 and a junction was built for it at Crossbush. In Spring 2018, Highways England published their preferred route for the new bypass. During 2018-19 there is a further period of consultation when views on a more detailed design for the four-mile dual carriageway will be sought.

Arundel railway station is on the Arun Valley Line. The Monarch's Way long-distance footpath passes through the town and crosses the river here, while just under five miles north and north-west of the town the route of the South Downs Way runs.

The town itself lies outside the boundaries of the South Downs National Park.

Society
Arundel is home to Arundel Castle, seat of the Duke of Norfolk; and to Arundel Cathedral, seat of the (Catholic) Bishop of Arundel and Brighton.

On 6 July 2004, Arundel was granted Fairtrade Town status.

People born in Arundel are known locally as Mullets, due to the presence of mullet in the River Arun.

Arundel is home to one of the oldest Scout Groups in the world. 1st Arundel (Earl of Arundel's Own) Scout Group was formed in 1908 only a few weeks after Scouting began. Based in an HQ in Green Lane Close, it has active sections of Beaver Scouts, Cub Scouts and Scouts.

Sport and leisure

Arundel has a non-League football club Arundel F.C. which plays at Mill Road.

The town also has its own cricket ground at the castle, often cited as being one of the country's most picturesque. It hosts Sussex County Cricket Club for a number of games each season.

Notable people

Christopher Alexander, architect.
Mary Chater, composer, Music Advisor to the Girl Guides and Justice of the Peace for Arundel from 1945 to 1961.
Nigel Cumberland, author.
Derek Davis, potter and painter.
Judy Geeson, actress.
St Philip Howard, 20th Earl of Arundel, part of the court of Queen Elizabeth I and a martyr for the Catholic faith.
Amelia Frances Howard-Gibbon, teacher and artist, was born in nearby Littlehampton and lived at Arundel as a child.
C. E. M. Joad, Philosopher and broadcaster, wrote many books at South Stoke Farm near Arundel.
George MacDonald, pastor of Trinity Congregational Church, 1850.
Liam Treadwell, jockey.

See also
Amberley Working Museum
An Arundel Tomb, a poem by Philip Larkin
Arundel Museum
Earls of Arundel
 Roger de Montgomery (died 1094), also known as Roger the Great de Montgomery
Fitzalan Chapel
List of places of worship in Arun
Portsmouth and Arundel Canal
South Marsh Mill, Arundel
Sussex in the High Middle Ages
Tortington
WWT Arundel

References

External links

Town Council

 
Market towns in West Sussex
Arun District
Towns with cathedrals in the United Kingdom
Towns in West Sussex